"Una casa in cima al mondo" is a 1966 Italian song composed by Vito Pallavicini and Pino Donaggio.  The song  premiered at the 16th edition of the Sanremo Music Festival, with a double performance by Donaggio and Claudio Villa, and placed at the fourth place. 
 
The song got an immediate commercial success, with the Donaggio's version peaking at the eighth place on the Italian hit parade. It was immediately covered by Mina, and her version got an even larger success, ranking #4 on the Italian hit parade. Donaggio and Mina also recorded a Spanish version of the song, ""Una casa encima del mundo".

It was later covered by numerous artists in several languages, including a French version titled "Demain" recorded by  Josephine Baker and Luis Mariano, a Portoguese version titled "Uma Casa Sobre O Mundo" by João Dias, and an English version titled "Don't Cry" recorded by The Ray Charles Singers.

Track listing
Pino Donaggio version
   7" single –  	SCMQ 1902
 "Una casa in cima al mondo"  (Vito Pallavicini, Pino Donaggio)
 "Non ho colpa" (Vito Pallavicini, Pino Donaggio)

Mina version
   7" single –  RFN NP 16125
 "Una casa in cima al mondo"  (Vito Pallavicini, Pino Donaggio)
 "Se tu non fossi qui" (Carlo Alberto Rossi, Marisa Terzi)

Charts

Pino Donaggio version

Mina version

References

 

1966 singles
Italian songs
1966 songs
Sanremo Music Festival songs
Mina (Italian singer) songs
Songs written by Pino Donaggio
Columbia Graphophone Company singles
Songs with lyrics by Vito Pallavicini